
The following is a list of winners of the Golden Calf for Best Acting in a Television Drama at the NFF.

 1994 Jack Wouterse as Lou – En Route
 1995 Huub Stapel as Hendrik – De Partizanen
 1996 Eric van der Donk as Schuyt – De Langste Reis
 1997 Gilles Biesheuvel as Gillis – Goede daden bij daglicht – That's no Way to Kill your Mother

Split up
In 1998 till 2020 the category was split into two different categories, Best Actor in a Television Drama and Best Actress in a Television Drama.

Best Actress
 1998 Saskia Temmink as Claire van Dijk-Bussink – Oud geld
 1999 Carice van Houten as Suzy – Suzy Q
 2000 Will van Kralingen as Meriam Blom – Storm in mijn hoofd
 2001 Joan Nederlof as Grace Keeley – Hertenkamp
 2012 Rifka Lodeizen as Elsie Couwenberg - Overspel
 2013 Monic Hendrickx as Carmen van Walraven - Penoza II
 2014 Loes Schnepper as Lies - One Night Stand IX
 2015 Ariane Schluter as Helen - One Night Stand X
 2016 Nazmiye Oral as Neziha - One Night Stand XI
 2017 Abbey Hoes as Pattie Jagersma - Petticoat
 2018 Ilse Warringa as Ank van Pijkeren - De Luizenmoeder
 2019 Rifka Lodeizen as Astrid Holleeder - Judas
 2020 Halina Reijn as Esther Finkel - Red Light

Best Actor
 1998 Gijs Scholten van Aschat as Ole Bussink – Oud geld
 1999 Jack Wouterse as Ko – Suzy Q
 2000 Kees Prins as Johnny Jordaan – Bij ons in de Jordaan
 2001 Pierre Bokma as Marcel Paroo – Belager
 2012 Jeroen Willems as Mirko Narain - Cop vs. Killer
 2013 Pierre Bokma as Rijkman Groenink - De prooi
 2014 Maarten Heijmans as Ramses Shaffy - Ramses
 2015 Jonas Smulders as Tomas - One Night Stand X
 2016 Jacob Derwig as Marius Milner - Klem
 2017 George Tobal & Majd Mardo as Ibrahim and Benyamin - One Night Stand XII
 2018 Kees Hulst as Hendrik Groen - Het geheime dagboek van Hendrik Groen
 2019 Gijs Naber as Willem Holleeder - Judas
 2020 Ramsey Nasr as Ischa Meijer - I.M.

Best leading role in a dramaseries (since 2021)
 2021 Werner Kolf as John de Koning - Commando's
 2022 Jeroen Spitzenberger as Pim Fortuyn - Het jaar van Fortuyn

Best supporting role in a dramaseries (Since 2021)
 2021 Michel Sluysman as Martin de Waard - The Spectacular
 2022 Charlie Chan Dagelet as Natasja Stigter - Dirty Lines

Best role in a Singleplay or Short Film (since 2021)
 2021 Laura Bakker as Lorah - Onze Straat: Heartbeats
 2022 Sinem Kavus as Meltem - Mocro Maffia: Meltem

References

External links
 NFF Website

Best Acting in a TV Drama